Margarita Nava (born 17 October 1946) is a Mexican equestrian. As of 2023 she lives, teaches and rides in Mexico City. Through Dressage she represented her country in Europe and South America from 1980 – 2000. Since the 1970's she has promoted riding as a way of life, therapy and sport. She competed in two events at the 1984 Summer Olympics.

References

External links
 

1946 births
Living people
Mexican female equestrians
Mexican dressage riders
Olympic equestrians of Mexico
Equestrians at the 1984 Summer Olympics
Pan American Games medalists in equestrian
Pan American Games silver medalists for Mexico
Pan American Games bronze medalists for Mexico
Equestrians at the 1983 Pan American Games
Equestrians at the 1987 Pan American Games
Equestrians at the 1991 Pan American Games
Place of birth missing (living people)
Medalists at the 1987 Pan American Games
Medalists at the 1991 Pan American Games